Kuroda Park is a stadium in Guasave, Mexico.  It is primarily used for baseball and serves as the home stadium for Algodoneros de Guasave of the Mexican Pacific League.  The stadium has a capacity of 8,500 people.

On 25 August 2021, the Algodoneros announced that the stadium would be renamed Kuroda Park following a three-year naming rights agreement with Sinaloa-based Grupo Kuroda.

References

1970 establishments in Mexico
Baseball venues in Mexico
Sports venues completed in 1970
Sports venues in Sinaloa